Thinaah Muralitharan (born 3 January 1998) is a Malaysian badminton player who entered the national team in 2013. She was the gold medalists in the women's doubles and mixed team event at the 2022 Commonwealth Games.

Career 
In 2021, Muralitharan with her partner Pearly Tan, clinched their first BWF World Tour title in the Swiss Open.

In 2022, Muralitharan and Tan claimed the French Open title, becomes the first ever Malaysian women's doubles to achieve this feat.

Personal life 
Muralitharan is the second child of S. Muralitharan, an engineer and Parimala Devi, a medical doctor. She has an older brother and a younger sister, Selinaah Muralitharan, who is a former Selangor state shuttler. She is fluent in four languages: Tamil, Bahasa Melayu, English and Mandarin, which she picked up from her friends when she was studying at the Bukit Jalil Sports School.

Achievements

Commonwealth Games 

Women's doubles

BWF World Tour (2 titles) 
The BWF World Tour, which was announced on 19 March 2017 and implemented in 2018, is a series of elite badminton tournaments sanctioned by the Badminton World Federation (BWF). The BWF World Tours are divided into levels of World Tour Finals, Super 1000, Super 750, Super 500, Super 300, and the BWF Tour Super 100.

Women's doubles

BWF International Challenge/Series (5 titles, 2 runners-up) 
Women's singles

Women's doubles

  BWF International Challenge tournament
  BWF International Series tournament

References

External links 
 

Living people
1998 births
People from Selangor
Malaysian sportspeople of Indian descent
Malaysian people of Tamil descent
Malaysian female badminton players
Badminton players at the 2022 Commonwealth Games
Commonwealth Games gold medallists for Malaysia
Commonwealth Games medallists in badminton
21st-century Malaysian women
Medallists at the 2022 Commonwealth Games